The Skirvin Hotel is a 225-room hotel located in downtown Oklahoma City and the city's oldest hotel. Comprising three towers of 14 floors in an Art Deco architectural style, it is listed on the National Register of Historic Places.

The property is managed by Marcus Hotels & Resorts under the Hilton brand, and is a member of Historic Hotels of America, the official program of the National Trust for Historic Preservation.



History
First opened in 1911, the Skirvin Hotel contained 225 rooms in a ten-story two-winged tower. A third 12-story wing was added in 1925, and then in 1929–30 all three wings were leveled off to 14 floors with a total of 525 rooms. The hotel is named for its founder, William Balser "Bill" Skirvin, whose daughter, Perle Mesta, became the ambassador to Luxembourg under Harry Truman. 

In 1945, Skirvin Hotel and Skirvin Tower was sold to local hotelier Dan James. Over the years, James executed several renovation works to revitalize the hotel and attract tourists visiting Oklahoma. Some of the new amenities include air conditioning, a new swimming pool, and new furnitures for the luxury rooms.

However, the hotel closed down in 1988 due to low occupancy. For the next 19 years, the hotel sat abandoned.

The process to return the hotel to life started nearly a decade earlier, however, when, in 1999, Oklahoma City Mayor Kirk Humphreys appointed a Skirvin Solutions Committee to evaluate whether or not the historic building could be saved. The committee started its work by touring other restored historic hotels, looking at how those projects were paid for, and then recommended in October 2000 that the City of Oklahoma City explore creating a public-private partnership to get the Skirvin re-opened. In May 2002, Oklahoma City acquired the building from its current owners for $2.875 million and issued a request for proposals from potential developers late that same year. Partners in Development, a firm put together by principal John Weeman, made a proposal to renovate the building for $42.1 million and to re-open it as a full-service Hilton operated by Marcus Hotels and Resorts. The Oklahoma City Urban Renewal Authority selected Partners in Development as the developer in January 2004. Weeman bought the building from Oklahoma City in 2005, and, using money he invested plus funds from various other public sources including tax increment financing, grants, Empowerment Zone credits, historic tax credits and New Markets tax credits, completed its renovation for about $51 million.

Skirvin Hotel was renovated and re-opened as part of the Hilton chain of hotels in 2007. The renovation project restored the original exterior finish, installed historically accurate windows, reconfigured guest rooms and added new guest elevators.

Haunting
Rumors of a haunting in the hotel persist, and have been cited by National Basketball Association (NBA) teams. The most notable examples occurred in 2010, when the New York Knicks famously blamed their loss to the Oklahoma City Thunder on the haunting and when the Chicago Bulls reported doors slamming shut on their own and strange sounds outside their rooms. The story received national attention again in June 2012, when the Miami Heat were staying in the hotel for the NBA Finals. More recently, the Baylor Lady Bears, who were the defending National Collegiate Athletic Association (NCAA) Division I women's basketball champions, were put up at the Skirvin. In one of the biggest upsets in tournament history, the Lady Bears unexpectedly lost 82–81 to Louisville in the regional semifinals of the 2013 NCAA Division I women's basketball tournament. In January 2019, Brooklyn Nets star Kyrie Irving announced that he was producing a feature film about the purported paranormal activity at the hotel.

Room 1015 is rumored to be the most haunted room in the hotel. As the story goes, the hotel's original owner, W. B. Skirvin, had an affair with a maid named "Effie", which led to a pregnancy. To protect his reputation and avoid a scandal, Skirvin locked the maid in room 1015. She eventually jumped out a window, killing herself and the baby. To avoid negative press attention, the death was written as a suicide by a salesman who killed herself.

Over the years, hotel staff say they have seen objects moving by themselves and have heard strange noises at night. According to Steve Lackmeyer (who also co-wrote a book about the hotel) and Jason Kersey (both reporters from The Oklahoman), Skirvin was "a notorious womanizer and drinker" and the 10th floor was known for various incidents of gambling and other vices, but there is no real-life evidence corresponding to the "Effie" story: Skirvin's family did believe that he had an employee (his assistant and bookkeeper, Mabel Luty) who was also his mistress, but she outlived him.

See also
 List of Historic Hotels of America

References

1910 establishments in Oklahoma
Buildings and structures in Oklahoma City
Hilton Hotels & Resorts hotels
Hotel buildings completed in 1910
Hotel buildings on the National Register of Historic Places in Oklahoma
Skirvin
National Register of Historic Places in Oklahoma City
Neoclassical architecture in Oklahoma
Reportedly haunted locations in Oklahoma
Historic Hotels of America
Haunted hotels